Abraeus brunneus is a beetle discovered by  Thomas Broun in 1881. There are no sub-species named in the Catalogue of Life.

References

Histeridae
Beetles described in 1881